Alien priories were religious establishments in England, such as monasteries and convents, which were under the control of another religious house outside England. Usually the mother-house was in France.

History
Alien Priories were small dependencies of foreign religious houses. Specifically, this pertained to the English possessions of French religious houses.

The precedent went back at least as far as 912. Ælfthryth, daughter of Alfred the Great married Baldwin II, Count of Flanders. She received various properties under her father's will, and gave Lewisham Priory with its dependencies, Greenwich and Woolwich, to the abbey of St Peter at Ghent. Edward the Confessor gave the parish church at Deerhurst, and its lands to the monastery of St Denis.

The practice increased after the Norman Conquest. A number of Norman lords had founded monasteries on their lands in France, which in many cases sent monks to England to manage their property. William the Conqueror gave to the Abbey of Saint-Étienne in Caen, the manors of Frampton and Bincombe in Dorset. During the reign of William Rufus, Hamelin de Balun, founded the Benedictine priory of St Mary, at Abergavenny under the jurisdiction of the Abbey of Saint Vincent at Le Mans. The designation "Alien Priory" included any property owned by the French houses, regardless of whether there was an actual priory, or religious house, constructed upon it.

Some priories enjoyed more autonomy than others. A distinction was drawn between those where the prior was appointed and served at the will of the abbot of the motherhouse, and those where the prior was elected by the monks. In the latter case, the land was vested in the priory and could not be sold by the abbot. The priories paid an apport, a nominal fixed sum, annually to the mother-house.

A medieval abbey which held distant estates normally administered them by establishing a small cell or priory of two or three monks to manage a manor or group of manors and send the profits to the mother-house. King John compelled them to pay into the royal treasury the apport.  During the reign of King Henry III (1216-1272), many alien priories were suppressed by Simon de Montfort's Parliament (the Parliament of Leicester, 1265), and their revenues were taken into the king's hands. The Crown, however, in most cases transferred the property to other monasteries.

In 1294, when King Edward I of England was at war with France, many of the alien priories were seized, numbering about a hundred, and their revenues were used to help pay for the war. In order to prevent the foreign monks in southern coastal areas giving possible help to invaders, he deported many of them to other religious houses that were twenty or more miles from the coast.

King Edward II of England subsequently followed this example, taking the alien priories into his own hands, but he not infrequently appointed their priors custodians for a consideration, obliging them to pay to the Crown the apport due to their superiors.

When Edward III came to the throne, he restored many of the alien priories to their original owners and waived the arrears of payments due to the Crown. But ten years later, when war broke out again with France, he reverted to the policy of his predecessors, and again seized the property of these French aliens. For twenty-three years, these foreign houses remained in his hands; but with the peace of 1361 most of them were restored, only to be again sequestrated eight years later when the war was renewed. In the time of Richard II, the alien priories continued mostly in the hands of the Crown.

In 1378, all the monks in alien priories were expelled from England. Most finally came to an end under Henry V in 1414, with a few exceptions surviving, for example Modbury Priory in Devon.

See also
 Valor Ecclesiasticus
 Suppression of Religious Houses Act 1535
 Suppression of Religious Houses Act 1539
 Dissolution of the Monasteries

References

Sources

External links
Monasticon Anglicanum